Hornes Road is a community in the Canadian province of Nova Scotia, located in the Cape Breton Regional Municipality on Cape Breton Island.
The area that became Hornes Road was originally land that was granted to Simeon Horne in November 1802, by Major General William Campbell, on behalf of the King of England.

References
 Hornes Road on Destination Nova Scotia

Communities in the Cape Breton Regional Municipality
General Service Areas in Nova Scotia